Batak is a Unicode block containing characters for writing the Batak dialects of Karo, Mandailing, Pakpak, Simalungun, and Toba.

History
The following Unicode-related documents record the purpose and process of defining specific characters in the Batak block:

References 

Unicode blocks